Pallasca District is one of 11 districts of the Pallasca Province in the Ancash region in Peru.

Location
Located in the North end of the  Ancash Mountain range, Pallasca is one of eleven districts of the Province of the same name and is bordered, in the south, by the districts of  Huacaschuqué and  Huandoval;
in the east, by  Lacabambá and Pampas; in the west, by Bolognesí, and in the north by Santiago de Chuco Province in La Libertad. It is situated approximately 3150 metres above sea level.

The population of the District of Pallasca is 5000 inhabitants.

Geography climate, economy, flora and fauna 
According to the geographic classification made by Dr. Javier Pulgar Vidal, Pallasca lies within the denominated Quechua Region. For that reason, its climate is relatively tempered, which does not prevent torrential rains between the months of November and March which feed the territory's crops which are the basic sustenance of the town.

The fact that it belongs to the Quechua Region does not, however, mean that the ancestral Language of the Incas is spoken there.

Pallasca is basically an agrarian district, dedicated mainly to the culture of la papa, maize and wheat; being, in addition, significant the gained raising of ganado vacunoand lanar; another occupation, in smaller scale, is artisanal crafts, mainly in the weave of "bayetas" (floorcloths), ponchos, etc.

Among the typical vegetation of the zone, it is possible to cultivate two aromatic plants, úñicá and  panizará, used locally as infusions; these plants which could be commercialized on a great scale, would generate significant economic income for the population and, would also be an alternative (and perhaps more pleasant) beverage to the tea and other products.

The pallasquina flora is rich and varied. Some of the known plants or typical vegetation are as follows: yerba santa, Shiraque, tarsana, penca (maguey), molle, willows, carhuacasha; mora (blackberry), payaya, shugurom, purpuro (tumbo); Panizo, úñica ; chulco, Achupallas; Aliza, eucalyptus. 
In addition, there are: wheat, potatoes, maize, quinoa, Coy (quiwicha), oca, etc.

Access
The District of Pallasca can be accessed from Chimbote on the Coast, by a hard road whose construction in the final section, from Sacaycacha, was obtained thanks to the collective efforts of inhabitants in 1973, led by Orlando Alvarez Castro, a Captain of the Peruvian Army. Pallasca is practically interconnected with all the towns of the Province by means of hard roads that they had, because is enough, to be paved to obtain a faster, comfortable and advisable access.

Folklore 
In June each year, Pallasca celebrates the Feast in the honor of the region's patron saint, San Juan Baustista. In such occasion some beautiful folkloric patterns/tapestries (known as "festejos" in Pallasca), among which are the Suplicio and death of the Atahualpá Inca, the one of whose typical characters is "Quishpe"; the Osos, Quiyayas,  Blanquillos, Indian Culculbambá, etc. also appear.

Other pleasing elements of the festival are the races of cintas and pedradas. Its centrepiece is the massive and fervent processions in tribute to the patron saint.

History 
Pallasca has history that goes back to the earliest times of la Spanish Conquest. Serious studies indicate that its name would come from Apollacsa Vilca Yupanqui Tuquiguarac, important noble Peruvian native who served during the passage of the first conquistadores, thus would have received coat of arms, according to the historian Felix Álvarez Brun in his book Ancash, a regional Peruvian history.

A fact which is apparently not so well known is that the corpse of Huáscar, the last legitimate heir of the Incan Empire, was thrown in waters of the River Tablachacá (formerly, Andamarca) by the Spanish conquistadores.

In the independence war, the district shared in the goals of the Peruvian people and the region contributed to its quota of men and equipment for the formation of the Army of liberation.

When the Chilean invasion took place, patriotic Peruvians refused to follow the abusive orders of the military leaders of the enemy force and preferred to face the enemy in unequal battle, with sticks, stones and hand-thrown weapons, resulting in thousands of dead and injured.

Notable people

Orlando Alvarez Castro
Due to the persistence, will, firmness and enthusiasm of Orlando Alvarez Castro, the highway was built from the coast to this cut-off city by means of the system of "topos", where 10 metres of road would be constructed by each member of the community, shopkeeper or teacher, and even the children, supported by food given by the women (unmarried and widows).

Alvarez, Captain of the Peruvian Army, committed to have a road built by the day of the festival in honor of the patron saint, San Juan Baustista, to allow the first motorized vehicle in the centre of Pallasca for the parade. On June 24, 1973 at 2 o'clock in the afternoon, a car already it was in the Plaza de Armas.

Don Manuelito Alvarado
The town of Pallasca owes much to Alvarado for its pride of have recovered a valuable part of its history from it.

Alvarado was a cautious, softly-spoken man of medium stature, round face, always dressed pulcro and was obsessed with reading to investigate and to know the town's history. He also talked with young people and adults and it spoke to them of the rich history. He was first in finding out the descendants of Apollacsa Vilca Yupanqui Tuquihuarac (that "noble Indian that served important during the passage of the first conquerors", according to Álvarez Brun).

Don Alonso Paredes recounted in writing that the observant young Alvarado had managed to rescue documents containing the titles of Incan nobility of Don Eusebio de la Cruz, 
"untiring defender of his community" from a fire, as well as others on which "the proud history of the town of Pallasca rests" (according to Paredes).

Other professionals
Dr. Felix Alvarez Brun Diplomat, Historian and University Professor, Julio Alvarez Sabogal, Diplomat
Justiniano Murphy Bocanegrá(f), Manuel Pizarro Flores(f), Domingo Fataccioli Zúñigá(f) and Carlos Bocanegra Vergaray, Miguel Alvarez Simonetti, Daniel Alvarez Arnao, Medical doctors
Orestes Rodriguez Campos(f), Alberto Rubio Fatacciolí(f), Olinda Gálvez Paredes, University teachers
Juan Murphy Bocanegrá(f) and Jorge Velasquez Gallarday,  lawyers
Alberto Rubio Alvarez(f). Geologist
Mercedes Caballero Calderón mother of six kids; Roberto Mejia Caballero, Guillermo Mejia Caballero, Carlos Mejia Caballero, Marina Mejia Caballero, Irma Victoria Mejia Caballero, Mirtha Consuelo Mejia Caballero (mother of Carlos Mauricio Martinez Mejia).

External links
 pretty Pallasquita 
 Pallasca in images 

Districts of the Pallasca Province
Districts of the Ancash Region